Now Bandegan (also Romanized as Now Bandegān and Naubandagān) is a city and capital of Now Bandegan District, in Fasa County, Fars Province, Iran.  At the 2006 census, its population was 2,933, in 766 families.

References

Populated places in Fasa County
Cities in Fars Province